Antwon is an African-American English given name associated with Antoine and Anthony in use in the United States. Notable people with this name include the following people.

Antwon, American hip hop recording artist
Antwon Blake (born 1990), American football cornerback
Antwon Burton (born 1983), American football defensive tackle
Antwon Hicks (born 1983), American hurdling athlete
Antwon Tanner (born 1975), American actor

Fictional characters
Antwon Mitchell, character in TV series The Shield
Antwon "Skills" Taylor, character in TV series One Tree Hill

See also
Shooting of Antwon Rose Jr.
Anthon (given name)
Antwan
Antoine
Antoon
Antwone
Antxon, name

Notes

African-American given names